The Star Screen Lifetime Achievement Award is an Indian cinema prize.  Each year the recipient is chosen by a panel of judges, and the winner is announced in December or January.

Winners

See also 
 Screen Awards

Screen Awards
Lifetime achievement awards